Anastasiia Komovych, nee Sapsai, (born 25 August 1994 in Cherkasy, Ukraine) is a Ukrainian sambist. She is 2019 European Games champion in women's sambo.

She works as lecturer at the Cherkasy Institute of Fire Safety.

References

External links
 
 

1994 births
Living people
Sportspeople from Cherkasy
Ukrainian sambo practitioners
Sambo practitioners at the 2019 European Games
European Games medalists in sambo
European Games gold medalists for Ukraine
21st-century Ukrainian women